Mihail Pavel (6 September 1827 – 1 June 1902) was a Romanian Greek Catholic hierarch. He was bishop of the Romanian Catholic Eparchy of Gherla, Armenopoli, Szamos-Ujvár from 1872 to 1879 and the Romanian Catholic Eparchy of Oradea Mare from 1879 to 1902.

Born in Recea, Maramureș, Austrian Empire (present day – Romania) in 1827, he was ordained a priest on 21 March 1852. He was confirmed the Bishop by the Holy See on 23 December 1872. He was consecrated to the Episcopate on 26 January 1873. The principal consecrator was Archbishop Ioan Vancea.

He died in Solotvyno (present day – Ukraine) on 1 June 1902.

References 

1827 births
1902 deaths
19th-century Eastern Catholic bishops
20th-century Eastern Catholic bishops
Romanian Greek-Catholic bishops